Strike Up the Band is a 1940 American musical film produced by the Arthur Freed unit at Metro-Goldwyn-Mayer.  The film was directed by Busby Berkeley and stars Mickey Rooney and Judy Garland, in the second of a series of musicals they co-starred in, after Babes in Arms, all directed by Berkeley. The story written for the 1927 stage musical Strike Up the Band, and its successful 1930 Broadway revision, bear no resemblance to this film, aside from the title song.

Plot
Jimmy Connors (Mickey Rooney), a student at Riverwood High School, plays the drums in the school band but dreams of playing in a dance band. He and his "gal" Mary Holden (Judy Garland) sell the school principal on the idea of forming a dance orchestra and putting on a dance to raise money. The principal is initially doubtful but then agrees to buy the first ticket. The event is a success, and the school's debt for the instruments is paid off.

Famous band leader Paul Whiteman (played by himself) sponsors a contest in Chicago for the best high school musical group, and Jimmy decides that the band must compete. In three weeks, the kids write, plan, and put on a show. The melodrama, called "Nell from New Rochelle", is also a success and raises almost enough money for the band to go to Chicago, but they're still short. A loan from Whiteman himself solves that problem. However, when, Willie, a member of the band who had been injured, needs a critical and urgent operation, the band uses the money so that the injured student can be flown to Chicago for the operation.

The band gets a last minute gift of a free ride on a fast train to Chicago. The band competes in Chicago and wins the $500 prize. Jimmy gets the honor of leading all of the bands in a grand finale performance of the title song.

Cast

Songs
In keeping with MGM's practice of the time, the film soundtrack was recorded in stereophonic sound but released with conventional monaural sound.  At least some of the original stereo recording has survived and been included in some home video releases, including the Mickey Rooney - Judy Garland Collection.

"Strike up the Band" (1927) – music by George Gershwin, lyrics by Ira Gershwin
Played during the opening credits, sung by Judy Garland, Mickey Rooney, and chorus in the finale
"Our Love Affair" (1939) – music by Roger Edens, lyrics by Arthur Freed
Played during the opening and end credits
Played on piano by Mickey Rooney and sung by Judy Garland and Mickey Rooney with orchestral accompaniment
Reprised by the animated fruit orchestra
Reprised by the band at rehearsal and at the dance
Reprised by Judy Garland and Mickey Rooney in the finale
Played often as background music
"Do the La Conga" (1939) – music and lyrics by Roger Edens
Performed by Judy Garland, Mickey Rooney, Sidney Miller
William Tracy and chorus at the dance
Reprised by the cast in the finale
"Nobody" (1939) – music and lyrics by Roger Edens
Sung by Judy Garland
"Oh Where, Oh Where Has My Little Dog Gone?" (uncredited) – traditional
Played as background music at the start of the fair sequence
"The Gay Nineties" – music and lyrics by Roger Edens
Performed by Judy Garland, Mickey Rooney, William Tracy,
Margaret Early and chorus at the Elks Club show
"Nell of New Rochelle" (1939) – music and lyrics by Roger Edens
Performed by Judy Garland, Mickey Rooney and chorus in the Elks club show
"Walking Down Broadway" (uncredited) – traditional, arranged by Roger Edens
Sung by the chorus in the "Nell of New Rochelle" sequence
"A Man Was the Cause of It All" (1939) – music and lyrics by Roger Edens
Sung by Judy Garland in the "Nell of New Rochelle" sequence
"After the Ball" (1891) – music by Charles Harris
Played as dance music in the "Nell of New Rochelle" sequence
"Sobre las olas (Over the Waves)" (1887) (uncredited) – music by Juventino Rosas
Played as background music in the "Nell of New Rochelle" sequence
"Heaven Will Protect the Working Girl" (1909) (uncredited) – music by A. Baldwin Sloane,  lyrics by Edgar Smith
Sung by Judy Garland, Mickey Rooney and chorus in the "Nell of New Rochelle" sequence
"Home, Sweet Home" (1823) (uncredited) – music by H.R. Bishop
Played as background music when Nell rocks the cradle
"Ta-ra-ra Boom-de-ay" (1891) (uncredited) – by Henry J. Sayers
Danced to and sung by June Preisser and sung by the chorus in the "Nell of New Rochelle" sequence
Reprised in the finale of the 'Nell of New Rochelle' sequence
"Come Home, Father" (1864) (uncredited) – music and lyrics by Henry Clay Work
Sung by Larry Nunn and Judy Garland in the "Nell of New Rochelle" sequence
"The Light Cavalry Overture" (uncredited) – music by Franz von Suppé
Played in the "Nell of New Rochelle" sequence several times
"Rock-a-Bye Baby" (1886) (uncredited) – music by Effie I. Canning
Played as background music when Willie is told to go home
"Five Foot Two, Eyes of Blue (Has Anybody Seen My Girl?)" (uncredited) – music by Ray Henderson
Played as background music when Jimmy and Barbara wait for her parents
"When Day is Done" (uncredited) – music by 
Opening number played by Paul Whiteman and Orchestra at Barbara's party
"Wonderful One" (uncredited) – music by Paul Whiteman and Ferde Grofé Sr.
Played as dance music by Paul Whiteman and Orchestra at Barbara's party
"Drummer Boy" (1939) – music by Roger Edens, lyrics by Roger Edens and Arthur Freed
Performed at Barbara's party by Judy Garland, Mickey Rooney (on drums and vibraphone) and other band members
Reprised by the cast in the finale
"China Boy" (uncredited) – by Dick Winfree and Phil Boutelje
Played as background music during the travel and contest montage
"Hands Across the Table" (1934) (uncredited) – music by Jean Delettre
Played as background music during the travel and contest montage
"Limehouse Blues" (1922) (uncredited) – music by Philip Braham
Played as background music during the travel and contest montage
"Tiger Rag" (1918) (uncredited) – by Edwin B. Edwards, Nick LaRocca, Tony Sbarbaro, Henry Ragas and Larry Shields
Played as background music during the travel and contest montage
"Columbia, the Gem of the Ocean" (1843) (uncredited) – arranged by Thomas A. Beckett
Played as background music when the flag is raised at the end

Reception

Box office
According to MGM records the film earned $2,265,000 in the US and Canada and $1,229,000 elsewhere resulting in a profit of $1,539,000.

Critical response
Daily Variety:
"While all the young principals do themselves proud, Garland particularly achieves rank as one of the screen's great personalities. Here she is for the first time in the full bloom and charm which is beyond childhood, as versatile in acting as she is excellent in song - a striking figure and a most oomphy one in the wild abandon of the La Conga."

Movie and Radio Guide, 1940:
"The La Conga danced by Mickey Rooney and Judy Garland in Strike Up the Band is nothing less than sensational. For that reason, Movie and Radio Guide hereby christens the number 'The Roogaronga.' This title is a combination of the first three letters of Mickey's and Judy's last names, to which has been added the identifying dance classification."

Variety, September 18, 1940:
"Strike Up the Band is Metro's successor to Babes in Arms with Mickey Rooney, assisted by major trouping on the part of Judy Garland ... Picture is overall smacko entertainment ... and Mickey Rooney teamed with Judy Garland is a wealth of effective entertainment."

Awards and honors
In 1941, the year after the film was released, the film was nominated for three Academy Awards. Douglas Shearer (M-G-M's Sound Director) won a Best Sound, Recording and Roger Edens and George Stoll were nominated for an Oscar in the category of Best Music, Original Song for the song "Our Love Affair". George Stoll and Roger Edens were also nominated for an Oscar in the category of Best Original Score.

The film is recognized by American Film Institute in these lists:
 2006: AFI's Greatest Movie Musicals – Nominated

Home media
As well as being commercially released in its own right on VHS on January 30, 1991 by MGM, the DVD version was released on September 25, 2007 by Warner Home Video as part of The Mickey Rooney & Judy Garland Collection. It was finally given an individual release on October 2, 2018 by Warner Archive Collection who also released a Blu-ray edition on June 23, 2020.

In popular culture

Strike Up the Band is featured in:

That's Entertainment! (1974)
Musicals Great Musicals: The Arthur Freed Unit at MGM (1996) (TV)
Hollywoodism: Jews, Movies and the American Dream (1998) (TV)
The Sopranos 6th season episode "Cold Stones!".

ReferencesNotesFurther reading'''
 Review in The New York Times''

External links

 
 
 
 
 
 Information at Soundtrack Collector
 DVDbeaver.com

Films directed by Busby Berkeley
American black-and-white films
1940s English-language films
1940 films
1940 musical films
1940s teen films
American musical films
Films that won the Best Sound Mixing Academy Award
Films produced by Arthur Freed
Films scored by Georgie Stoll
Metro-Goldwyn-Mayer films
Films about music and musicians
Films set in schools
1940s American films